Daniel Langlois (born 1957 in Jonquière) is the president and founder of the Daniel Langlois Foundation, Ex-Centris, and Media Principia Inc.

Daniel Langlois also founded Softimage Inc., serving as its president and chief technology officer from November 1986 to July 1998. The company is recognized in the fields of cinema and media creation for its digital technologies and especially its 3-D computer animation techniques. Softimage software was used to create 3-D effects in such films as Star Wars: Episode I – The Phantom Menace, The Matrix, Titanic, Men in Black, Twister, Jurassic Park, The Mask and The City of Lost Children.

Before establishing Softimage Inc., Langlois earned a bachelor of design degree from the Université du Québec à Montréal. He also worked eight years as a film director and animator for private companies and the National Film Board of Canada. During this time, he made contributions to the film industry and especially to the field of computer graphics. In addition, he has gained recognition for his work on Transitions, first stereoscopic 3-D computer animation in IMAX format (presented at Expo 86). He also had a hand in the 1985 film Tony de Peltrie, which has garnered several international awards.

Mr. Langlois has received many honours throughout his career. In 1994, Ernst & Young chose him as Canada's national entrepreneur of the year. The Université de Sherbrooke bestowed an honorary doctorate degree in administration on Mr. Langlois in 1996. In 1997, the Academy of Motion Picture Arts and Sciences presented him with a Scientific and Technical Oscar.

In 1999, he became a Knight of the National Order of Quebec and was named as an Officer of the Order of Canada in 2000.

In recent years, Daniel Langlois is involved in sustainable development and research projects for the creation of self-sustainability for small communities and some industrial sectors such as the hospitality sector. Coulibri Ridge (coulibriridge.com) which is part of this research process in Dominica, has been awarded Gold and Platinum Winner as well as Grand Winner in the Hotel and Tourism Development category at the 15th Edition of the Grands Prix du Design 2022.

Evaluated by a multidisciplinary international jury made up of professionals, academics and members of the press, Coulibri Ridge was the overall winner in the Hotel and Tourism Development category. The international award recognizes excellence in design and celebrates the talented professionals who inspire through their creative vision.

Daniel Langlois Foundation
The Daniel Langlois Foundation is a non-profit, philanthropic organization endowed by Daniel Langlois and chartered in 1997 with the mission to support artistic and scientific projects and research dedicated to further general human awareness as well as the understanding of human relation with its natural and technological environment.

The purpose of the foundation is to further artistic and scientific knowledge by fostering the meeting of art and science in the field of technologies and the environment. The Foundation seeks to nurture a critical awareness of technology's implications for human beings and their natural and cultural environments, and to promote the exploration of aesthetics suited to evolving human environments. The Foundation Centre for Research and Documentation (CR+D) seeks to document history, artworks and practices associated with electronic and digital media arts and to make this information available to researchers in an innovative manner through data communications.

In 2005, the foundation initiated the development of DOCAM (Documentation and Conservation of the Media Arts Heritage). This international research alliance's primary objective is to develop new methodologies and tools to address the issues of preserving and documenting technological and electronic works of art

The Daniel Langlois Foundation, DOCAM and its Centre for Research and Documentation are located in Montreal.

Resilient Dominica (RezDM.org) is a Non-Government Organisation (NGO) formed in 2018 shortly after Hurricane Maria by the Daniel Langlois Foundation in an attempt to rebuild and strengthen resilience in Dominica in the communities of Soufriere, Scotts Head, and Gallion.

References

External links
 Softimage company website
 Daniel Langlois Foundation
 DOCAM
 Resilient Dominica (RezDM)
 Coulibri Ridge

1957 births
Living people
Artists from Montreal
Businesspeople from Montreal
Canadian animated film directors
Canadian animated film producers
Canadian company founders
Canadian media executives
Chief technology officers
Film directors from Montreal
Film festival founders
French Quebecers
Knights of the National Order of Quebec
National Film Board of Canada people
Officers of the Order of Canada
Technology company founders
Université du Québec à Montréal alumni